John William Clancy (February 24, 1888 – March 2, 1969) was a United States district judge of the United States District Court for the Southern District of New York from 1936 to 1969 an its Chief Judge from 1956 to 1959.

Education and career

Born in New York City, New York, Clancy received a Bachelor of Arts degree from Fordham University in 1909 and a Bachelor of Laws from Fordham University School of Law in 1912. He was in private practice in New York City from 1912 to 1936.

Federal judicial service

On June 15, 1936, Clancy was nominated by President Franklin D. Roosevelt to a new seat on the United States District Court for the Southern District of New York created by 49 Stat. 1491. He was confirmed by the United States Senate on June 20, 1936, and received his commission two days later. He served as Chief Judge from 1956 to 1959, assuming senior status on April 3, 1959. Clancy served in that capacity until his death in New York City on March 2, 1969.

References

Sources
 

1888 births
1969 deaths
Fordham University alumni
Fordham University School of Law alumni
Judges of the United States District Court for the Southern District of New York
United States district court judges appointed by Franklin D. Roosevelt
20th-century American judges
Lawyers from New York City